Sunshine is a suburb of the City of Lake Macquarie in New South Wales, Australia on a peninsula east of the town of Morisset on the western side of Lake Macquarie. The Awabakal were the first inhabitants of the area.

Early industries included fishing, timbercutting, subsistence farming and boatbuilding.

References

External links
 History of Sunshine (Lake Macquarie City Library)

Suburbs of Lake Macquarie